During the 2000–01 season, the Spanish football club :Deportivo Alavés was placed 10th in the :La Liga. The team reached the final round of the :UEFA Cup.

Season summary
Deportivo Alavés enjoyed one of the greatest seasons in its history. Although they were unable to improve on the previous season's sixth-placed finish, they reached the final of the UEFA Cup for the first time in their history, facing English giants Liverpool. Alavés fought bravely and finished normal time level with Liverpool 4–4; the game went to extra-time, where Alavés narrowly lost to a golden own goal.

Squad
Squad at end of season

Left club during season

La Liga

League table

Results

Results by round

Matches

Copa del Rey

UEFA Cup

First round

Alavés won 4–3 on aggregate.

Second round

Alavés win 5–3 on aggregate

Third round

Alavés win 4–2 on aggregate.

Fourth round

Alavés win 5–3 on aggregate.

Quarter-finals

Alavés win 4–2 on aggregate

Semi-final

Alavés win 9–2 on aggregate.

Final

See also
Deportivo Alavés
2000–01 La Liga
Copa del Rey

References

Deportivo Alavés seasons
Deportivo Alaves